This list is of the Intangible Cultural Properties of Japan in the Prefecture of Mie.

National Cultural Properties
As of 1 February 2015, one Important Intangible Cultural Property has been designated, being of national significance.

Craft Techniques

Prefectural Cultural Properties
As of 1 May 2014, two properties have been designated at a prefectural level.

Performing Arts

Craft Techniques

Municipal Cultural Properties
As of 1 May 2014, eleven properties have been designated at a municipal level.

See also
 Cultural Properties of Japan

References

External links
  Cultural Properties in Mie Prefecture

Culture in Mie Prefecture
Mie